Three ships of the Royal Navy have been named HMS Dorsetshire, after the traditional county of Dorsetshire:

 was an 80-gun third rate launched in 1694, rebuilt in 1712, and sold in 1749.
 was a 70-gun third rate launched in 1757 and broken up in 1775.
 was a  heavy cruiser launched in 1929 and sunk in 1942.

Royal Navy ship names